The Cikapundung River divides the city of Bandung, in West Java, Indonesia. The river flows from its headwaters in Lembang on the northern edge of the city, to the south, where it empties into the Citarum River.

The name Cikapundung is derived from the Sundanese language, and means river (ci, cai: water) and the name of a type of fruit: kapundung or kepundung (Baccaurea racemosa).

Despite being one of the main sources of Bandung's water supply, the river is classified as heavily polluted. Domestic waste, including human waste and detergents, is the main source of pollution as more people are living along the river banks. Other sources of pollutants are industry agriculture and farming.

See also 
 List of rivers of Indonesia

References

Bandung
Rivers of West Java
Rivers of Indonesia